Rafael Pollack (born October 28, 1988) is a retired Austrian footballer.

Career

Coaching career
In the 2014-15 season, while playing for Wiener SK, Pollack also worked as a youth coach at the club. Pollack continued as an active player for a few years, before he was hired as an athletic coach at SK Rapid Wien under the staff of Goran Djuricin in the summer 2018. From the new year 2019, he was instead moved to the clubs reserve team backroom staff.

In December 2020, Pollack was appointed player-manager at USV Atzenbrugg-Heiligeneich at the age of 32. He left the position in November 2021, as he accepted a job offer from FCM Traiskirchen, becoming the clubs new assistant manager under head coach Zeljko Radovic, who he formerly worked together with at Rapid Wien. Radovic and his staff, including Pollack, was fired in May 2022.

In June 2022, Pollack joined SV Horn as assistant manager under his former VfB Lübeck-teammate, Rolf Landerl. On 20 September 2022, Pollack and Landerl resigned from their positions. On 6 November 2022, the duo landed a new job at Admira Wacker.

References

External links
Rafael Pollack at ÖFB

1988 births
Living people
Austrian footballers
Austrian expatriate footballers
FC Admira Wacker Mödling players
NAC Breda players
VfB Lübeck players
Floridsdorfer AC players
FC Waidhofen/Ybbs players
Association football midfielders
Austrian expatriate sportspeople in Germany
Expatriate footballers in Germany
Austrian football managers